Ondřej Zetek (born October 2, 1971) is a Czech former professional ice hockey defenceman.

Zetek played in the Czechoslovak First Ice Hockey League and the Czech Extraliga for HC Litvínov, HC Železárny Třinec, HC Plzeň and HC Vítkovice. He also played one season in the Tipsport Liga for HC SKP Poprad during the 1998–99 season.

References

External links

1971 births
Living people
Czech ice hockey defencemen
HC Litvínov players
HC Most players
HC Oceláři Třinec players
HC Plzeň players
HK Poprad players
HC Tábor players
HC Vítkovice players
VHK Vsetín players
Czech expatriate ice hockey players in Germany
Czech expatriate ice hockey players in Slovakia